Songs & More Songs by Tom Lehrer is a reissue of musical satirist Tom Lehrer's two studio albums (Songs by Tom Lehrer and More of Tom Lehrer), combined with other studio sessions and a newly recorded version of "I Got It From Agnes".  "Agnes" was a song from Lehrer's early live repertoire which he "polished up" for the Cameron Mackintosh-produced musical revue Tomfoolery in 1981, but which Lehrer himself never professionally recorded until 1996. The booklet notes include an essay by Dr. Demento and the original sleeve notes from the LP releases.

The material from Songs and More of... were the original versions self-issued on Lehrer Records, the 1966 Reprise rerecording of Songs not considered for the reissue. Although More of... was originally released in both monophonic and stereo versions, the producers of the reissue opted for the mono mix.

Track listing

Session notes
The orchestral versions on tracks 24–27 were from a January 21, 1960 session with accompaniment  conducted by Richard Hayman. Tracks 24 and 25 were originally issued as a single on Capricorn Records, while track 26 was first issued on the 1997 Rhino compilation Dr. Demento 25th Anniversary Collection. Track 28 was recorded on October 8, 1996.

References

Tom Lehrer albums
1997 compilation albums
Rhino Records compilation albums
Reissue albums
1990s comedy albums